The name Owen has been used for seven tropical cyclones worldwide. 

In the Western Pacific Ocean: 
 Typhoon Owen (1979) (T7917, 19W, Rosing) 
 Typhoon Owen (1982) (T8224, 26W) 
 Tropical Storm Owen (1986) (T8606, 06W, Emang) 
 Typhoon Owen (1989) (T8915, 18W) 
 Typhoon Owen (1990) (T9028, 30W, Uding) 
 Tropical Storm Owen (1994) (T9402, 02W, Bising) 

In the Australian region: 
 Cyclone Owen (2018) – long-lived and erratic cyclone that affected Queensland 

Atlantic hurricane set index articles
Pacific typhoon set index articles
Australian region cyclone set index articles